The 2027 ICC Under-19 Women's T20 World Cup will be the third  edition of the ICC Women's Under-19 Cricket World Cup, scheduled to be hosted by Bangladesh and Nepal in 2027. Schedule of the tournament yet to be announced.

References

Under-19 Women's T20 World Cup